The men's sprint competition of the Sochi 2014 Olympics was held at Laura Biathlon & Ski Complex on 8 February 2014. It was 10 kilometres in length (6.2 miles).

The defending Olympic Champion was Vincent Jay of France, who has retired since the previous Olympics. The defending World Champion is Emil Hegle Svendsen of Norway.

Qualification

Countries were assigned quotas using a combination of the Nation Cup scores of their top 3 athletes in the individual, sprint, and relay competitions at the 2012 World Championships in Ruhpolding, Germany, and the 2013 World Championships in Nové Město na Moravě, Czech Republic. The top 20 nations would be able to start four athletes in the sprint, while nations 21 through 28 could start one each. Nations below 28 could only start if any nation decided to vacate a quota spot.

During the 2012–13 or 2013–14 Biathlon World Cup season the athlete must have two results at IBU Cup, Open European Championships, World Championships or World Cup in the Sprint or Individual that at a maximum 20% behind the average time of the top three athletes. Or, two placings in the top half at the Junior World Championships. They also can have a combination of both criteria (one of each).

Schedule
All dates and times are (UTC+4).

Results
The race was started at 18:30.

Ole Einar Bjørndalen won the event with a time of 24:33.5, 1.3 seconds ahead of silver medalist Dominik Landertinger. Bjørndalen missed one of the targets but was able to use his speed to make up the lost time.  Jaroslav Soukup finished third for the bronze medal.

The gold medal was Bjørndalen's 12th Olympic medal, equaling a record set by fellow Norwegian Bjørn Dæhlie. At 40 years old, he is also the oldest man ever to win an Olympic gold medal in an individual event at the Winter Games. Bjørndalen won his 3rd gold medal in the Olympic men's sprint.

References

Sprint